John Andrew Hawley (born 27 April 1950) was the current Archdeacon of Blackburn  from 2002 until 2015.

He was educated at Ecclesfield Grammar School and King's College London, trained at Wycliffe Hall, Oxford and was ordained in 1976 After curacies in Hull and Bradford he was Vicar of All Saints, Doncaster then Team Rector of Dewsbury until his appointment as Archdeacon of Blackburn.

References

1950 births
People educated at Ecclesfield Grammar School
Alumni of King's College London
Archdeacons of Blackburn
Living people